Athar Zaidi (12 November 1946 – 30 November 2012) was a Pakistani cricket umpire. He stood in eight Test matches between 1990 and 2002 and ten ODI games between 1984 and 1999.

See also
 List of Test cricket umpires
 List of One Day International cricket umpires

References

1946 births
2012 deaths
People from Lahore
Pakistani Test cricket umpires
Pakistani One Day International cricket umpires